Two Fyodors is a 1958 Soviet drama film directed by Marlen Khutsiev.

Plot 
After the end of the World War II, Fyodor  returned to his homeland and met the homeless boy Fyodor the Small. They decide to live together. And all they had was wonderful, until Fyodor  married.

With the marriage of Fyodor Sr., their harmonious life is disorganized, although Natasha is trying in every way to win the boy's love. Driven by jealousy to despair, the boy runs away from home. But after much agitation and searching, they find him, and he reconciles with the adults.

Cast 
 Vasily Shukshin as Great Fyodor
  Nikolai Chursin  as Little Fyodor
 Tamara Syomina as Natasha
 Ivan Poletayev as Ivan
  Maria Shamanskaya as Fyodor's neighbor
 Igor Politayev
 Aleksandr Kamenko-Aleksandrovskiy
 Dmitri Ivanov
 N. Lopatnikov
 K. Zabashta
 Nikolai Klyuchnev

Release 
Marlen Khutsiev's film   was watched by 20.4 million viewers, which is 908 results in the entire history of the Soviet film distribution.

References

External links 
 
 Two Fyodors on Kinopoisk

1958 films
1950s Russian-language films
1950s war drama films
Odesa Film Studio films
Films directed by Marlen Khutsiev
Soviet black-and-white films
Soviet war drama films
Eastern Front of World War II films
1958 drama films
Films scored by Yuliy Meitus